Turning Wheels is a monthly publication of the Studebaker Drivers Club, Inc. dedicated to the preservation, maintenance and enjoyment of Studebaker vehicles. Since its inception in 1972, it has become what is generally regarded to be one of the best single-marque car magazines published. The headquarters is in Maple Grove, Minnesota. Monthly features include:

 The President's Message, a look at what's going on within the Club and the hobby in general;
 The Studebaker Co-Operator, an excellent resource wherein members' tech questions are answered by the club's technical advisors;
 The Studebaker Almanac, a column dedicated to the history of the Studebaker Corporation and its people and products;
 What's Happening, a listing of club events from local meetings to regional and national meets;
 Letters to the Editor and classified ads.

Other recurring features include columns on modified Studebakers, reader submissions and detailed overviews of specific years and models.

A subscription to Turning Wheels is included with a membership in the 13,000 member Studebaker Drivers Club, which was founded in 1962 and is the largest of three US organizations serving Studebaker owners. Libraries and schools are eligible to receive Turning Wheels subscriptions at a reduced rate.

References

Automobile magazines published in the United States
Monthly magazines published in the United States
Magazines established in 1972
Magazines published in Minnesota